Daxing Biomedical Industry Base, full name Zhongguancun Science and Technology Park Daxing Biomedical Industry Base, is a state-level economic and technological development zone in Tiangongyuan Subdistrict, Daxing District, Beijing, China. As of 2020, its census population was 10,201.

References 

Daxing District
Science and technology in the People's Republic of China